Malawi is divided into 28 districts within three regions. Each District is headed by a District Commissioner:

See also
 ISO 3166-2:MW

References

Other sources

 
Subdivisions of Malawi
Malawi, Districts
Malawi 1
Districts, Malawi
Malawi geography-related lists